Betula alnoides (literally: "tiger power") is a species of birch that can be found in natural condition of such countries as Bangladesh, Bhutan, Cambodia, China, India, Laos, Myanmar, Nepal, Thailand and Vietnam at an elevation of  and higher in some cases (up to ). The southernmost of all known birch species, whose natural range reaches approximately 12° N in Cardamom Mountains, Cambodia.

Description

Uses
Betula alnoides inner bark is edible and is used for making cakes and bread. It is also considered to be an antidote against snakebites and is used to treat dislocated bones.

References

alnoides
Trees of Bhutan
Trees of China
Trees of Indo-China
Trees of Nepal